Murashige and Skoog medium (or MSO or  MS0 (MS-zero)) is a plant growth medium used in the laboratories for cultivation of plant cell culture. MS0 was invented by plant scientists Toshio Murashige and Folke K. Skoog in 1962 during Murashige's search for a new plant growth regulator. A number behind the letters MS is used to indicate the sucrose concentration of the medium. For example, MS0 contains no sucrose and MS20 contains 20 g/L sucrose. Along with its modifications, it is the most commonly used medium in plant tissue culture experiments in the laboratory, but according to the latest scientific findings, MS medium is not suitable as a nutrient solution for deep water culture.

As Skoog's doctoral student, Murashige originally set out to find an as-yet undiscovered growth hormone present in tobacco juice. No such component was discovered; instead, analysis of juiced tobacco and ashed tobacco revealed higher concentrations of specific minerals in plant tissues than were previously known. A series of experiments demonstrated that varying the levels of these nutrients enhanced growth substantially over existing formulations. It was determined that nitrogen in particular enhanced growth of tobacco in tissue culture.

Ingredients

Major salts (macronutrients) per litre
Ammonium nitrate (NH4NO3) 1650 mg/l
Calcium chloride (CaCl2 · 2H2O) 440 mg/l
Magnesium sulfate (MgSO4 · 7H2O) 370 mg/l
Monopotassium phosphate (KH2PO4) 170 mg/l
Potassium nitrate (KNO3) 1900 mg/l.

Minor salts (micronutrients) per litre
Boric acid (H3BO3) 6. 2 mg/l
Cobalt chloride (CoCl2 · 6H2O) 0.025 mg/l
Ferrous sulfate (FeSO4 · 7H2O) 27.8 mg/l
Manganese(II) sulfate (MnSO4 · 4H2O) 22.3 mg/l	  	
Potassium iodide (KI) 0.83 mg/l
Sodium molybdate (Na2MoO4 · 2H2O) 0.25 mg/l
Zinc sulfate (ZnSO4·7H2O) 8.6 mg/l
Ethylenediaminetetraacetic acid ferric sodium (FeNaEDTA) 36.70 mg/L
Copper sulfate (CuSO4 · 5H2O) 0.025 mg/l

Vitamins and organic compounds per litre 
Myo-Inositol 100 mg/l
Nicotinic Acid 0.5 mg/l
Pyridoxine · HCl 0.5 mg/l
Thiamine · HCl 0.1 mg/l
Glycine 2 mg/l
Tryptone 1 g/l (optional) 
Indole Acetic Acid 1-30 mg/l (optional)
Kinetin 0.04-10 mg/l (optional)

See also
Hoagland solution

References

Laboratory techniques
Botany
Cell culture media